Mitzi Patricia Kremer (born March 18, 1968), later known by her married name Mitzi Tighe, is an American former competition swimmer who represented the United States at the 1988 Summer Olympics in Seoul, South Korea.  Kremer received a bronze medal as a member of the third-place U.S. team in the women's 4×100-meter freestyle relay, together with teammates Mary Wayte, Dara Torres and Laura Walker.

Kremer attended Clemson University, where she swam for the Clemson Tigers swimming and diving team in National Collegiate Athletic Association (NCAA) and Atlantic Coast Conference (ACC) competition.  She is recognized as the university's most decorated swimmer, having won two NCAA championships, sixteen All-American honors, and five ACC championships.

She was the head coach of Team New Tampa YMCA club swim team, in Tampa, Florida, until 2010.  She lives in Titusville, Florida, where she grew up, and is in charge of the Space Coast Aquatic Club and ROCOA of Brevard in Brevard County, Florida.

See also
 List of Clemson University Olympians
 List of Olympic medalists in swimming (women)

References

External links
 Mitzi Kremer – Olympic Games results at databaseOlympics.com

1968 births
Living people
American female freestyle swimmers
American swimming coaches
Clemson Tigers women's swimmers
Olympic bronze medalists for the United States in swimming
Swimmers at the 1988 Summer Olympics
Titusville High School alumni
Place of birth missing (living people)
Medalists at the 1988 Summer Olympics
Universiade medalists in swimming
Universiade gold medalists for the United States
Universiade silver medalists for the United States
People from Titusville, Florida
Medalists at the 1987 Summer Universiade